Nacaduba schneideri  is a species of lycaenid butterfly found in the Australasian realm where it is endemic to the Bismarck Archipelago. The species was first described by Carl Ribbe in 1899.

References

Nacaduba
Butterflies described in 1899